Picu or PICU may refer to:

 Picu, a village in the Romanian commune of Ionești, Gorj
 Pediatric intensive care unit
 Psychiatric intensive-care unit